Mary Roberts may refer to:

Mary Roberts (bodybuilder) (born 1950), professional female bodybuilder
Mary Roberts (painter) (died 1761), first female miniaturist in the American colonies
Mary Roberts Rinehart (1876–1958), author, maiden name Mary Roberts
Mary Roberts (poet), see 1822 in poetry
Mary Roberts (author) (1788–1864), author, born London
Mary Fanton Roberts (1864–1956), American journalist
Mary Helen Roberts (born 1947), American politician in the state of Washington
Mary Wendy Roberts (born 1944), American politician in the state of Oregon
Mary Louise Roberts (1886–1968), New Zealand masseuse, physiotherapist and mountaineer
Mary Grant Roberts (1841–1921), Australian zoo owner
Cokie Roberts (1943–2019), real name Mary Roberts, American journalist and author